Mount Levick is a prominent mountain,  high, standing at the northwest side of Tourmaline Plateau in the Deep Freeze Range of Victoria Land, Antarctica. It was first charted by the Northern Party of the British Antarctic Expedition, 1910–13, and named for George Murray Levick, surgeon with the expedition and a member of the Northern Party.

References

Mountains of Victoria Land
Scott Coast